Slappy Cakes is a restaurant chain based out of Portland, Oregon and serving primarily breakfast food with locations in the United States and Singapore.

History

Slappy cakes was started in 2009 by Ashley Berry and Adam Fuderer in the Belmont district of Portland, Oregon. The restaurant features tabletop griddles and batter is served in a plastic bottle so that patrons can draw designs on the griddle. In 2020, Slappy Cakes announced that it would open a location in Highland Park neighborhood of Los Angeles. In 2013, Slappy Cakes opened a location in the Shinjuku neighborhood of Tokyo, Japan. By 2019, the restaurant chain had expanded to Malaysia, Japan, and Singapore.

Locations

United States
Sunnyside's Belmont district, Portland, Oregon (opened 2009)
Lahaina, Hawaii

Asia
Plaza Singapura, Orchard Road, Singapore
Resorts World Sentosa, Sentosa, Singapore
Publika, Solaris Dutamas, Malaysia
Osaka, Japan
Shinjuku, Tokyo, Japan

References

Restaurants in Portland, Oregon
Restaurants in Hawaii
Restaurants in Singapore
Restaurants established in 2009
Pancake houses
2009 establishments in Oregon
Sunnyside, Portland, Oregon